Here follows a list of people from Fullerton, California; that is, of persons born in or who have spent a significant portion of their life in Fullerton, California.

Arts 

 C.S. Forester, novelist 
 Dave Halili, album cover illustrator & designer
 Jeff Soto, contemporary artist 
 Philip K. Dick, author, science fiction

Athletics 

 Al Campanis, baseball player and executive.
 Arky Vaughan, Hall of Fame baseball player
 C. J. Cron,  professional baseball player for the Minnesota Twins
D. J. Houlton, baseball player who currently plays for Yomiuri Giants in Japan
 Dan Kennedy, soccer player
 David Newhan, baseball player
 Ed Amelung, baseball player
 Eric Wynalda, soccer player
 Gary Carter, baseball player, member of MLB Hall of Fame, attended Sunny Hills High School
 Gary Zimmerman, football player
 Hector Dyer, Olympic swimmer
 Jack Salveson, baseball player
 Jeff Tam, baseball player
 Jim Edmonds, baseball player
 John Sullivan, football player
 Keith Van Horn, basketball player
 Kourtney Kunichika, professional ice hockey player for the Buffalo Beauts of the NWHL
 Lynn Hill, competitive rock climber
 Mike Witt, baseball pitcher
 Paul Abbott, baseball pitcher
 Phil Nevin, baseball player
 Randy Jones, baseball pitcher
 Shaun Butler, BMX rider
 Shawn Ray, bodybuilder
 Tommy Lasorda, Hall of Fame baseball manager and Dodgers executive, lived in Fullerton
 Kay Hansen, mixed martial artist

Film, Television & Theatre 

 Chris Hebert, actor
 Chuck Knipp
 James Cameron, Oscar-winning film director
 Jenna Haze, actress
 Jeremy Gable, playwright 
 John Raitt, Broadway, television, and film actor and singer
 Kevin Costner, actor and Oscar-winning director, graduate of California State University, Fullerton
 Kim Chambers
Michael McDonald, actor and comedian
 Skip Stellrecht, actor
 Steven Seagal, actor
 Suzanne Crough, actress

Music 

 Agent Orange (band)
 Alfie Agnew, mathematician, songwriter and musician
Brian St. Clair, drummer for Local H, was raised in Fullerton, California
 Dennis Danell, musician
 Frank Agnew, songwriter and musician
 Gwen Stefani, singer and television personality
 Jackson Browne, folk music singer-songwriter, graduated from Sunny Hills High School
 Jory Prum, recording engineer
 Leo Fender, inventor, guitar manufacturer
 Lit (band)
 Mike Ness, musician
 Rikk Agnew, songwriter and musician
 Social Distortion
 Stacey Q, singer, songwriter & actress
 The Adolescents
 Tui St. George Tucker, composer, recorder player, instrument developer
 Überzone, electronic musician

Politics 

Dick Ackerman, politician
Lon Nol, former president of Khmer Republic
Sam L. Collins, politician
Viet D. Dinh, assistant U.S. Attorney General under George W. Bush
William E. Dannemeyer, politician

Other 

David Boies, attorney
James Harder, engineer, professor
Ethel Jacobson, poet
Leon Leyson, believed to be the youngest member of the Schindlerjuden who were saved from the Holocaust by Oskar Schindler
Kelly Thomas, homeless man beaten to death by the Fullerton Police Department
John Witt (Ballhawk), baseball collector

See also

 List of people from Orange County, California

References

 
Fullerton, California
Lists of people from California